The golden-capped boulder frog (Cophixalus pakayakulangun) is a species of rainforest frog that is endemic to Australia.

Etymology
The specific epithet pakayakulangun has the approximate meaning of ‘belonging among the boulders’, from a local term in Kuuku Ya’u, a language of the Pakadji, or Sandbeach People, of eastern Cape York.

Description
The species grows up to about 55 mm in length (SVL). Colouration is grey or brown on the back; the belly is pale grey; there is often a yellow patch over the snout and eyelids. There are dark stripes from the snout to behind the eyes; the groin and backs of the thighs are pale orange-pink. The fingers and toes are unwebbed.

Behaviour
The frogs feed primarily on ants.

Distribution and habitat
The species is only known from the type locality, just south of Stanley Hill and north of the Pascoe River, on the Cape York Peninsula of tropical Far North Queensland. There the frogs inhabit deeply piled granite boulder fields festooned with tropical rainforest vegetation.

References

 
Cophixalus
Amphibians of Queensland
Amphibians described in 2011
Frogs of Australia